Phallus luteus is a species of fungus in the stinkhorn family. First described in 1936 as Dictyophora lutea, it was transferred to the genus Phallus in 2009. It is widely distributed in Asia, including China, Korea, Japan, and India, and has been collected in Mexico.

References

External links

Fungi described in 1936
Fungi of Asia
Fungi of Mexico
Phallales
Fungi without expected TNC conservation status